Vamanjoor is a residential locality which falls within the city corporation of Mangalore in Karnataka, India. It is en route to Moodabidri and Karkala by National Highway 169 (old NH13).

Vamanjoor in Detail
Vamanjoor is a tourist and residential locality in the Coastal city of Mangalore in Karnataka, India, close to Kudupu and Gurupura. Vamanjoor is famous for many historic as well as geographical reasons. It is also home for the first ever and the only Catholic Engineering institute in Karnataka, St. Joseph Engineering College. Famous tourist attractions in Vamanjoor include Pilikula Nisargadhama, Swami Vivekananda Planetarium and Manasa water park. The doordarshan (state television) broadcasting facility for Mangalore is based at Vamanjoor. The biggest residential complex in the area is the quarters of the officers and staff of the Mangalore regional headquarters of the Employees' Provident Fund Organisation.

Notable Places in Vamanjoor 
 
 Shri Amrutheshwara Temple, Thiruvail, Vamanjoor
 Shri Vishnumurthy Temple Thiruvail 
 Pilikula Nisargadhama
 Pilikula Golf Course
 Pilikula Wildlife Zoo  
 Pilikula Botanical Garden
 Swami Vivekananda Planetarium
 Manasa Amusement and Water Park
 Pilikula Heritage Village
 Pilikula Jungle Lodge & Resort
 Doordarshan Maintenance Centre 
 Vamanjoor Junction 
 Dharma Jyothi Social Centre
 St. Joseph the Worker Church- Vamanjoor 
 St. Joseph Engineering College 
 St. Raymond's PU College
 Karavali College of Pharmacy 
 Mangala Jyothi Integrated school (MJIS)
 TB Hospital
 LUCIANA - Home for Senior Citizens
 Ave Maria Palliative Care

Nearby Locations
 Kudupu
 Mudushedde
 Kaikamba
 Polali
 Gurupura
 Neerala
 Neermarga

References

External links 

Localities in Mangalore
Cities and towns in Dakshina Kannada district